Ellen is an American television sitcom that was broadcast on ABC from March 29, 1994, until July 22, 1998. The series was created by Neal Marlens, Carol Black and David S. Rosenthal. It was originally titled These Friends of Mine, but it was changed after the first season to avoid confusion with the NBC series Friends. Ellen stars stand-up comedian Ellen DeGeneres as Ellen Morgan, a Los Angeles bookstore owner in her thirties. The series centers on Ellen's daily life, her friends and her family.

Awards and nominations

Artios Awards
The Artios Awards have been annually presented by the Casting Society of America (CSA) since 1985. The awards recognise excellence in theatrical, film, and television casting.

American Comedy Awards

BMI Film & TV Awards

Directors Guild of America

GLAAD Media Awards

Golden Globe Awards

Primetime Emmy Awards

Satellite Awards

Screen Actors Guild

Writers Guild of America Awards

References

External links
Awards and nominations for Ellen at IMDb

Ellen
Awards